Emerald City is an American fantasy drama television series developed for NBC by Matthew Arnold and Josh Friedman based on the early 20th-century Oz book series written by L. Frank Baum, set in the fictional Land of Oz. Directed by Tarsem Singh and starring Adria Arjona, Oliver Jackson-Cohen, Ana Ularu and Vincent D'Onofrio, Emerald City received a 10-episode order by NBC in April 2015, which premiered on January 6, 2017, with a two-episode debut, and concluded on March 3, 2017. The series received mostly negative critical reviews, and was the lowest rated series on NBC. On May 5, 2017, NBC canceled the series after one season.

Premise
After being transported from Lucas, Kansas, to the Land of Oz by a tornado, 20-year-old Dorothy Gale sets out to find the Wizard, unaware that she is about to fulfill a prophecy that will change everyone's lives forever.

Cast and characters

Main
Adria Arjona as Dorothy Gale: a nurse from Lucas, Kansas who embarks on a perilous journey to Emerald City in an attempt to meet the Wizard and find her way back home.
Oliver Jackson-Cohen as Roan / Lucas: an amnesiac who accompanies Dorothy in an attempt to regain his lost memory and quickly finds himself falling in love with her.
Ana Ularu as West: the former Witch of the West, one of the Cardinal Witchesthe four most powerful of the 1,000-plus witches in Oz. West is the opium-addicted madam of a brothel who continues to use her magical abilities despite the fact that she blames magic for failing to save her fellow witches.
Mido Hamada as Eamonn: an unquestioningly loyal member of the Wizard's Guard who is personally tasked with finding Dorothy before she reaches Emerald City and doing whatever it takes to prevent the Beast Forever's return.
Gerran Howell as Jack: a young man who is reanimated following a horrific accident and forced into servitude only to find himself growing close to his new mistress.
Jordan Loughran as Ozma / Tip: a teenager who sets out to discover her true-self after being freed from a spell that has kept her in the form of a boy for most of her life.
Joely Richardson as Glinda: the former Witch of the North, one of the four powerful Cardinal Witches. Glinda runs an orphanage for potential members of the Wizard's High Council and has held a deep-seated hatred towards the Wizard ever since he outlawed magic.
Vincent D'Onofrio as Frank Morgan / The Wizard of Oz: an enigmatic figure who sought to reinvent himself by ruling Oz and, in doing so, created a world where magic is outlawed. The character is named after Frank Morgan, who played the Wizard in the 1939 film.

Recurring
Florence Kasumba as East: the Witch of the East, one of the Cardinal Witches - the four most powerful of the 1,000-plus witches in Oz. East created the Prison of the Abject, holding witches who illegally practiced magic. East keeps deals with the Wizard for her own purposes and is on a fight against her sister Glinda.
Isabel Lucas as Anna: a member of the Wizard's High Council who quickly becomes his closest advisor after challenging his theory about the Beast Forever's return.
Roxy Sternberg as Elizabeth: a member of the Wizard's High Council who is determined to prove herself and protect Oz from the Beast Forever.
Stefanie Martini as Langwidere: the eccentric Princess of Ev who is determined to exact vengeance against the Wizard for leaving her mother and her people to die at the Beast Forever's hands.
Rebeka Rea as Leith / Sylvie: a child witch with dangerous abilities whom Dorothy and Lucas first come across in the woods near Nimbo and who seems to recognize Lucas.
Gina McKee as Dr. Jane Andrews: a contractor for the Royal Family of Ev who shares a mysterious connection to both Dorothy and the Wizard.
Ólafur Darri Ólafsson as Ojo: a member of the Munja'kin tribe who is determined to do whatever it takes to save his wife Nahara from the Prison of the Abject.

Production
The series was created by Matthew Arnold who pitched an alternative telling, a dark, edgy version of The Wizard of Oz to Universal Television. Arnold wrote the pilot script, which then received a 10 episode direct-to-series order on NBC. Josh Friedman was brought on as showrunner.

The series was originally slated to air in 2015, with filming scheduled to begin in 2014.  However, it was cancelled before entering production due to creative differences between Friedman and the studio.

On April 15, 2015, NBC reversed course and decided to go ahead with the series. On July 14, 2015, it was announced that Tarsem Singh would direct all ten episodes, with David Schulner as new showrunner, replacing Josh Friedman, and Shaun Cassidy coming on board as executive producer.

Episodes

Special
A special episode, titled "Oz Reimagined: The Making of Emerald City", originally aired on December 16, 2016, and detailed the behind the scenes of the series including locations, effects, costumes and interviews.

Broadcast
The series premiered on January 6, 2017 in the U.S. on NBC. The series launched on 5Star in the UK on February 8, 2017 to 670,000 viewers, the TV station's largest audience to date.

Reception

Ratings 
The series premiered to low ratings among the demographic of adults aged 18–49, which continued to decline throughout its first season. The series finale drew in 2.9 million viewers. It ended as one of the lowest rated NBC series of 2017.

Critical reception 
The review aggregator website Rotten Tomatoes reported a 38% approval rating based on 42 reviews, with an average score of 5.2/10. The website's consensus reads, "Dark and brooding, but also confusing and contrived, Emerald City is the Game of Thrones/Wizard of Oz mashup nobody asked for." Metacritic reported a score of 47 out of 100 based on 31 reviews, indicating "mixed or average reviews".

Home media

References

External links
 
 
 
 

2010s American LGBT-related drama television series
2017 American television series debuts
2017 American television series endings
American fantasy television series
English-language television shows
High fantasy television series
Television about magic
NBC original programming
Television shows based on American novels
Television series based on The Wizard of Oz
Television series by Universal Television
Television shows filmed in Croatia
Television shows filmed in Hungary
Television shows filmed in Spain
Witchcraft in television
American fantasy drama television series